The 53rd season of the Campeonato Gaúcho kicked off on August 13, 1972, and ended on August 5, 1973. Twenty-two teams participated. Internacional won their 21st title.

Participating teams

System 
The championship would have three stages.:

 Preliminary phase: The twelve best clubs in the first phase of Copa Governador do Estado of the previous year would join the eight teams that had qualified to the 1972 Campeonato Gaúcho's decagonal, with the resulting twenty teams playing in a single round-robin format against each other. The preliminary also counted as the Final phase of the 1972 Copa Governador do Estado, and the ten best teams would qualify to the Dodecagonal. the ten bottom teams would qualify to the second phase of the 1973 Copa Governador do Estado.
 Dodecagonal: The remaining ten teams, now joined by Grêmio and Internacional, would play each other in a double round-robin format.
 Finals: The winners of the two rounds of the Decagonal qualified to this stage. If the same team won both stages, it would win the title automatically.

Championship

Preliminary phase (Taça Governador do Estado)

Dodecagonal

First round

Second round

Final standings

Copa Governador do Estado

System 
The cup would have two stages: 

 First phase: Twenty-five teams would be divided into five groups of five teams. Each team would play twice against the teams of its own group. The two best teams in each group qualified to the Second phase.
 Second phase: The ten remaining teams joined the ten teams that had been eliminated in the Dodecagonal phase of the Campeonato Gaúcho and played each other in a single round-robin format. The 12 best teams would qualify to the 1974 Campeonato Gaúcho.

First phase

Group A

Group B

Group C

Group D

Group E

Second phase

References 

Campeonato Gaúcho seasons
Gaúcho